Universidad Pedagógica Experimental Libertador (Libertador Experimental Pedagogical University, UPEL) is the main public university institute, dedicated to the formation of teachers and professors in Venezuela. Its main headquarters is on Caracas, the capital of Venezuela, with centers in other regions, including Aragua, Lara, Miranda, Monagas, and Tachira. The Institute of Professional Improvement of Teachers constitutes part of the structure of the UPEL, which was named in honor of Simón Bolívar.

References 

Universities and colleges in Caracas